In number theory, quadratic integers are a generalization of the usual integers to quadratic fields.  Quadratic integers are algebraic integers of degree two, that is, solutions of equations of the form 

When algebraic integers are considered, the usual integers are often called rational integers.

Another common example is the non-real cubic root of unity , which generates the Eisenstein integers.

Quadratic integers occur in the solutions of many Diophantine equations, such as Pell's equations, and other questions related to integral quadratic forms. The study of rings of quadratic integers is basic for many questions of algebraic number theory.

History

Medieval Indian mathematicians had already discovered a multiplication of quadratic integers of the same , which allowed them to solve some cases of Pell's equation.

Definition 
A quadratic integer is an algebraic integer of degree two. More explicitly, it is a complex number , which solves an equation of the form , with b and c integers. Each quadratic integer that is not an integer is not rational—namely, it's a real irrational number if  and non-real if —and lies in a uniquely determined quadratic field , the extension of  generated by the square root of the unique square-free integer  that satisfies  for some integer . If  is positive, the quadratic integer is real. If , it is imaginary (that is, complex and non-real).

The quadratic integers (including the ordinary integers) that belong to a quadratic field  form an integral domain called the ring of integers of 

Although the quadratic integers belonging to a given quadratic field form a ring, the set of all quadratic integers is not a ring because it is not closed under addition or multiplication.

Explicit representation
Here and in the following, the quadratic integers that are considered belong to a quadratic field  where  is a square-free integer. This does not restrict the generality, as the equality  (for any positive integer ) implies 

 
or, if  is a multiple of 

In other words, every quadratic integer may be written , where  and  are integers, and where  is defined by

(as  has been supposed square-free the case  is impossible, since it would imply that  is divisible by the square 4).

Norm and conjugation 
A quadratic integer in  may be written 
,
where  and  are either both integers, or, only if , both halves of odd integers. The norm of such a quadratic integer is 
.

The norm of a quadratic integer is always an integer. If , the norm of a quadratic integer is the square of its absolute value as a complex number (this is false if ). The norm is a completely multiplicative function, which means that the norm of a product of quadratic integers is always the product of their norms.

Every quadratic integer  has a conjugate

A quadratic integer has the same norm as its conjugate, and this norm is the product of the quadratic integer and its conjugate. The conjugate of a sum or a product of quadratic integers is the sum or the product (respectively) of the conjugates. This means that the conjugation is an automorphism of the ring of the integers of —see , below.

Quadratic integer rings 

Every square-free integer (different from 0 and 1)  defines a quadratic integer ring, which is the integral domain consisting of the algebraic integers contained in  It is the set  where  if , and  otherwise.

The fundamental theorem of arithmetic is not true in many rings of quadratic integers. However, there is a unique factorization for ideals, which is expressed by the fact that every ring of algebraic integers is a Dedekind domain. Being the simplest examples of algebraic integers, quadratic integers are commonly the starting examples of most studies of algebraic number theory.

For real quadratic integer rings, the class number – which measures the failure of unique factorization – is given in OEIS A003649; for the imaginary case, they are given in OEIS A000924.

Units
In the first case its multiplicative inverse is its conjugate. It is the negation of its conjugate in the second case.

If , the ring of the integers of  has at most six units.

Given a fundamental unit , there are three other fundamental units, its conjugate  and also  and  Commonly, one calls "the fundamental unit" the unique one which has an absolute value greater than 1 (as a real number).

For larger , the coefficients of the fundamental unit may be very large.

Examples of complex quadratic integer rings 

For  < 0,  is a complex (imaginary or otherwise non-real) number. Therefore, it is natural to treat a quadratic integer ring as a set of algebraic complex numbers.
Both rings mentioned above are rings of integers of cyclotomic fields Q(ζ&hairsp;4) and Q(ζ&hairsp;3) correspondingly.
In contrast, Z[] is not even a Dedekind domain.

Both above examples are principal ideal rings and also Euclidean domains for the norm. This is not the case for 

which is not even a unique factorization domain. This can be shown as follows.

In  we have

Thus the factorization of 9 into irreducible factors is not unique.

Examples of real quadratic integer rings 

For ,  is a positive irrational real number, and the corresponding quadratic integer ring is a set of algebraic real numbers.
 For ,  is the golden ratio. This ring was studied by Peter Gustav Lejeune Dirichlet. Its units have the form , where  is an arbitrary integer. This ring also arises from studying 5-fold rotational symmetry on Euclidean plane, for example, Penrose tilings.
Some results were presented to European community by Pierre Fermat in 1657.

Principal rings of quadratic integers 

However, as for every Dedekind domain, a ring of quadratic integers is a unique factorization domain if and only if it is a principal ideal domain. This occurs if and only if the class number of the corresponding quadratic field  is one.

The imaginary rings of quadratic integers that are principal ideal rings have been completely determined.
. 
This result was first conjectured by Gauss and proven by Kurt Heegner, although Heegner's proof was not believed until Harold Stark gave a later proof in 1967 (see Stark–Heegner theorem). This is a special case of the famous class number problem.

There are many known positive integers , for which the ring of quadratic integers is a principal ideal ring. However, the complete list is not known; it is not even known if the number of these principal ideal rings is finite or not.

Euclidean rings of quadratic integers 

When a ring of quadratic integers is a principal ideal domain, it is interesting to know whether it is a Euclidean domain. This problem has been completely solved as follows.

Equipped with the norm
 as a Euclidean function,
 is a Euclidean domain for negative  when 
, 
and, for positive , when 
 .
There is no other ring of quadratic integers that is Euclidean with the norm as a Euclidean function.

For negative , a ring of quadratic integers is Euclidean if and only if the norm is a Euclidean function for it. It follows that, for 
, 
the four corresponding rings of quadratic integers are among the rare known examples of principal ideal domains that are not Euclidean domains.

On the other hand, the generalized Riemann hypothesis implies that a ring of real quadratic integers that is a principal ideal domain is also a Euclidean domain for some Euclidean function, which can indeed differ from the usual norm.
The values D = 14, 69 were the first for which the ring of quadratic integers was proven to be Euclidean, but not norm-Euclidean.

Notes

References 

. Retrieved 5. August 2009
Dummit, D. S., and Foote, R. M., 2004. Abstract Algebra, 3rd ed.
Artin, M, Algebra, 2nd ed., Ch 13.

Further reading

J.S. Milne. Algebraic Number Theory, Version 3.01, September 28, 2008. online lecture notes

Algebraic number theory
Ring theory
Integers